Wandsbek station was a station in the German city of Hamburg. It was built during the construction of the Lübeck–Hamburg railway by the Lübeck-Büchen Railway Company (Lübeck-Büchener Eisenbahn). The railway line cuts through the Wandsbeker Gehölz (Wandsbek wood) here.

Former station building

The three-part building was opened in 1865. The single-storey middle section was originally decorated with gables and a clock.  Two-storey wings were added on its sides, which served as entrance and exit halls. The eastern wing was modified after damage during the Second World War.

Despite the changes, the stucco building with its neoclassical forms, which were usual at the time, has heritage protection. The building is now used as a restaurant called the Hofbräu-Wirtshaus Wandsbek. The platform was renewed in 2003 and received a new roof, a lift, new signs and new lighting.

Closure

The station has been closed in December 2021, as part of the construction of Hamburg S-Bahn line S 4. It will be replaced by the new Bovestraße station, which will be built about 300 metres from the present station at the Bovestraße/Bahngärten intersection. The movement of the stop will also simplify several bus routes and shorten the route to the neighbouring Asklepios Klinik Wandsbek hospital.

Regional services 

At the time of its closure, the station was served by the following service:

Notes

Defunct railway stations in Germany
Wandsbek station
Hamburg Wandsbek
Hamburg Wandsbek